John Corbett is the self-titled debut album of American actor and singer John Corbett. It was released on April 4, 2006 via Funbone Records. The album charted as high as number 45 on Top Country Albums upon release, and included a single which reached the Hot Country Songs charts: "Good to Go".

Content
The album produced only one single: "Good to Go", which peaked at number 43 on the Hot Country Songs charts in 2006. The song debuted at number 48 on that chart dated for the week of February 11, 2006, the highest debut for an independently signed artist's first single since the charts were first tabulated with Nielsen SoundScan in 1990. Jason Aldean previously recorded the song on his 2005 self-titled debut album.

Contributing musicians included Jimmy Hall of Wet Willie, Steve Gorman of The Black Crowes, and George McCorkle of The Marshall Tucker Band. Corbett self-released the album after multiple major labels failed to give him an offer. Corbett's girlfriend, Bo Derek, took the front cover picture.

Critical reception
Robert Woolridge of Country Standard Time reviewed the album with general favor, saying that "Though Corbett does not write any of the tunes here he chooses wisely." and "Corbett delivers strong, soulful vocals throughout, though too often his voice is buried in the mix of layered harmonies." Stephen Thomas Erlewine of Allmusic rated it 3 out of 5 stars, with his review saying that "But what makes this a winning debut is that it feels natural and genuine, as if Corbett isn't attempting to parlay his success as an actor into a music career, he's just simply making the music he wants to make."

Track listing
"Bottle of Whiskey" (Gary Nicholson, Jon Randall) – 4:19
"Good to Go" (Rodney Clawson, Tim Nichols) – 4:33
"Revival" (David Lee, Ashley Gorley, Bryan Simpson) – 4:17
"Wichita" (Roxie Dean, Rivers Rutherford, Dave Turnbull, Houston Boyd Robert) – 4:01
"Cash" (Jon Randall, Jessi Alexander) – 3:48
"Simple Man" (Hal Ketchum, Darrell Scott) – 4:51
"Back Door to My Heart" (Mark Selby, Tia Sillers) – 3:26
"Best Move" (George McCorkle, D. Scott Miller)  – 4:56
"Leave" (Bernie Taupin) – 3:46
"Waiting on a Heartache" (Brian Butler, Ric Butler, Miller) – 3:21
"Judge a Man" (Don Poythress, Barry Dean) – 4:26
"Last Stand" (Taupin, Dennis Tufano, Robin Le Mesurier, Jim Cregan) – 4:37

Personnel
Compiled from liner notes.
Musicians
 Mike Brignardello – bass guitar
 Pat Buchanan – electric guitar
 Sarah Buxton – background vocals
 Perry Coleman – background vocals
 John Corbett – lead vocals
 J. T. Corenflos – acoustic guitar, electric guitar
 Steve Gorman – drums
 Jimmy Hall – background vocals, harmonica
 Aubrey Haynie – fiddle
 Mike Johnson – pedal steel guitar, lap steel guitar
 George McCorkle – electric guitar
 D. Scott Miller – acoustic guitar, electric guitar
 Jonell Mosser – background vocals
 Tara Novick – electric guitar
 Mike Rojas – piano, Hammond B-3 organ
 Russell Terrell – background vocals
 Kenny Vaughan – acoustic guitar, electric guitar
Derek Wolfford – percussion
Technical
 Kevin Beamish – engineering
 Dan Frizsell –engineering, mastering
 D. Scott Miller – production
 Tara Novick – production

Chart performance
Album

Singles

References

2006 debut albums
John Corbett albums